Brombach is a river of Hesse, Germany.

In the district  of Bad König, it discharges into the Mümling.

See also
List of rivers of Hesse

References

Rivers of Hesse
Rivers of Germany